Jatun Urqu may refer to:

 Jatun Urqu (Bolivia), a mountain in the Bolivian Andes
 Jatun Urqu (Matarani), a mountain in the Bolivian Andes
 Jatun Urqu (Mizque), a mountain in the Bolivian Andes
 Jatun Urqu (Potosí), a mountain in the Bolivian Andes